Ellis Forrest was a member of the South Carolina House of Representatives during the Reconstruction era. He represented Orangeburg.

References

Members of the South Carolina House of Representatives